Flaming Schoolgirls is the rock band The Runaways' fifth and final album, released in 1980, a year after the band had broken up. A compilation of previously unreleased recordings, the album consists of one alternate version and three unreleased tracks from the sessions for the 1977 album Queens of Noise, five live tracks left over from the 1977 album Live in Japan, and two Cherie Currie demo recordings. The album was not released in the U.S.

Track listing

Personnel
 Cherie Currie – lead vocals, keyboards
 Joan Jett – rhythm guitar, vocals
 Lita Ford – lead guitar, backing vocals
 Jackie Fox – bass, backing vocals
 Sandy West – drums, backing vocals

Production
 Kim Fowley – producer of Cherie Currie demo and all studio outtakes
 Earle Mankey – producer of studio outtakes
 Kent J. Smythe – producer with The Runaways of live outtakes
 Alan Wilson – mastering
 Alex Blades – re-issue coordination
 Niva Bringas – liner notes, photography

References

1980 albums
The Runaways albums
Cherry Red Records compilation albums